This page shows the results of the Cycling Competition at the 1979 Pan American Games, held from July 1 to July 15, 1979 in San Juan, Puerto Rico. There were a total number of six events, with only men competing.

Men's competition

Men's 1.000m Match Sprint (Track)

Men's 1.000m Time Trial (Track)

Men's 4.000m Individual Pursuit (Track)

Men's 4.000m Team Pursuit (Track)

Men's Individual Race (Road)

Men's Team Time Trial (Road)

Medal table

References
Results

Pan American
1979 Pan American Games
1979
1979 in road cycling
1979 in track cycling
International cycle races hosted by Puerto Rico